New Boston is a city in Mercer County, Illinois, United States on the Mississippi River. The population was 613 at the 2020 census, down from 683 in 2010.

History
New Boston was settled in the 1830s by "Yankee" migrants from Massachusetts.

Geography
New Boston is located on the western edge of Mercer County and the state of Illinois at  (41.169570, -90.996709). It sits on the east bank of the Mississippi River, at the mouth of Boston Bay and its inflow, Eliza Creek.

Illinois Route 17 has its western terminus in New Boston and leads east  to Aledo, the Mercer county seat.

Much of the natural area surrounding New Boston is part of the Port Louisa National Wildlife Refuge. The river valley at New Boston is surrounded on both sides by gently rolling bluffs interspersed with rich parcels of wetlands that provide critical wildlife habitat, especially for migratory birds.

Demographics

As of the census of 2000, there were 632 people, 269 households, and 177 families residing in the city. The racial makeup of the city was 99.53% White, 0.16% African-American, 0.16% Native American, 0.16% from other races. Hispanic or Latino of any race were 0.32% of the population.

There were 269 households, out of which 28.3% had children under the age of 18 living with them, 53.2% were married couples living together, 8.2% had a female householder with no husband present, and 34.2% were non-families. 29.0% of all households were made up of individuals, and 12.3% had someone living alone who was 65 years of age or older. The average household size was 2.35 and the average family size was 2.92.

In the city, the population was spread out, with 23.1% under the age of 18, 9.3% from 18 to 24, 25.9% from 25 to 44, 24.5% from 45 to 64, and 17.1% who were 65 years of age or older. The median age was 40 years. For every 100 females, there were 103.2 males. For every 100 females age 18 and over, there were 102.5 males.

The median income for a household in the city was $29,231, and the median income for a family was $36,875. Males had a median income of $32,361 versus $17,917 for females. The per capita income for the city was $15,593. About 6.4% of families and 11.2% of the population were below the poverty line, including 15.9% of those under age 18 and 11.7% of those age 65 or over.

Notable people
Henry Asp, Oklahoma lawyer
Paul G. Blazer, first president and CEO of Ashland Inc.
Robert M. Danford, U.S. Army major general

References

External links

Panorama of New Boston

Cities in Illinois
Illinois populated places on the Mississippi River
Cities in Mercer County, Illinois